Lauren Ann Chapin (born May 23, 1945) is an American former child actress who played the role of the youngest child "Kathy Anderson" (nicknamed "Kitten") in the television show Father Knows Best, between 1954 and 1960. She appeared in 196 episodes of the 203 in the series. Chapin was awarded five Junior Emmys for Best Child Actress. Two of her older brothers were also child stars, Billy and Michael Chapin.

Career
She had roles in  A Star is Born (1954), The Bob Hope Show (1954), The Ed Sullivan Show (1958), The Adventures of Don Quixote and Sancho Panza (1976), Scout's Honor (1980), The 36th Prime Time Emmy Awards (1984), and School Bus Diaries (2016).

Personal life
In the early 1980s, Chapin taught natural childbirth and worked for a brokerage firm. She later owned two beauty pageant enterprises and helped manage and start the career of Jennifer Love Hewitt.  In 1989 she wrote an autobiography, Father Does Know Best: The Lauren Chapin Story. She is a licensed and ordained evangelist and advocate for Israel.

References

External links

Official site

1945 births
American child actresses
American television actresses
Living people
Actresses from Los Angeles
21st-century American women